For All Mankind is an American science fiction drama television series created by Ronald D. Moore, Matt Wolpert and Ben Nedivi and produced for Apple TV+. The series dramatizes an alternate history depicting "what would have happened if the global space race had never ended" after the Soviet Union succeeds in the first crewed Moon landing ahead of the United States. The title is inspired by the lunar plaque left on the moon by the crew of Apollo 11, which reads in part "We Came In Peace For All Mankind".

The series stars an ensemble cast including Joel Kinnaman, Michael Dorman, Sarah Jones, Shantel VanSanten, Jodi Balfour, and Wrenn Schmidt. Sonya Walger, and Krys Marshall. Cynthy Wu, Casey W. Johnson and Coral Peña joined the main cast for the second season, while Edi Gathegi joined in the third. The series features historical figures including Apollo 11 astronauts Neil Armstrong, Buzz Aldrin, and Michael Collins, Mercury Seven astronaut Deke Slayton, rocket scientist Wernher von Braun, astronaut Sally Ride, NASA Administrator Thomas Paine, NASA flight director Gene Kranz, U.S. senators Ted Kennedy and Gary Hart, along with U.S. presidents Richard Nixon, Ronald Reagan and Bill Clinton.

For All Mankind premiered on November 1, 2019, and was renewed by Apple TV+ in October 2019 for a second season, which premiered on February 19, 2021. The second season was critically acclaimed, and nominated for the TCA Award for Outstanding Achievement in Drama. In December 2020, ahead of the second-season premiere, the series was renewed for a third season, which premiered on June 10, 2022. In July 2022, the series was renewed for a fourth season.

Premise
In an alternate timeline in 1969, Soviet cosmonaut Alexei Leonov becomes the first human to land on the Moon. This outcome devastates morale at NASA, but also catalyzes a U.S. effort to catch up. With the Soviet Union emphasizing diversity by including a woman in subsequent landings, the United States is forced to match pace, training women and minorities who were largely excluded from the initial decades of U.S. space exploration. Each subsequent season takes place ten years later, with season 2 taking place in the 1980s, season 3 taking place in the 1990s, (and as revealed in the season 3 finale) season 4 taking place in the 2000s.

Ronald D. Moore explained how history had been different in the series: "Sergei Korolev was the father of the Soviet space program; in our reality, he died during an operation in Moscow (in 1965) ... And after that point, their Moon program really never pulled together.... Our point of divergence was that Korolev lives, ... and he made their Moon landing happen."

Cast and characters

Main
Joel Kinnaman as Edward "Ed" Baldwin, one of NASA's top astronauts, based on Apollo 10 commander Thomas P. Stafford.
Michael Dorman as Gordon "Gordo" Stevens (seasons 1–2), an astronaut and Ed's best friend, based on Apollo 10's lunar module pilot Eugene Cernan.
Sarah Jones as Tracy Stevens (seasons 1–2), Gordo's wife who later also becomes an astronaut as one of "Nixon's Women".
Shantel VanSanten as Karen Baldwin (seasons 1–3), Ed's wife who later owns the Outpost Tavern, a bar usually visited by NASA astronauts.
Jodi Balfour as Ellen Wilson (née Waverly), an astronaut and member of "Nixon's Women" who later becomes Administrator of NASA, a Senator and President of the United States following the 1992 Presidential Election.
Wrenn Schmidt as Margo Madison, a NASA engineer who was mentored by Wernher von Braun, based on Frances Northcutt.
Sonya Walger as Molly Cobb (seasons 2–3; recurring season 1), an astronaut and member of "Nixon's Women", based on Jerrie Cobb.
Krys Marshall as Danielle Poole (season 2–present; recurring season 1), an astronaut and member of "Nixon's Women".
Cynthy Wu as Kelly Baldwin (née Hanh Nguyen, before adoption) (season 2–present), a scientist and Ed's and Karen's adopted daughter.
Casey W. Johnson as Danny Stevens (season 2–present), an astronaut and Gordo's and Tracy's son.
Jason David and Mason Thames as young Danny Stevens (recurring season 1) 
Coral Peña as Aleida Rosales (season 2–present), an undocumented immigrant who is fascinated by space and later gets mentored by Margo.
Olivia Trujillo as young Aleida Rosales (recurring season 1)
Edi Gathegi as Dev Ayesa (season 3–present), the founder of Helios Aerospace, a private space company with the goal to reach Mars before NASA and the Soviet Union.

Recurring

Chris Bauer as Deke Slayton (season 1)
Colm Feore as Wernher von Braun (season 1)
Eric Ladin as Gene Kranz (season 1)
Michael Harney as Jack Broadstreet (season 1), a news anchor.
Dan Donohue as Thomas O. Paine (seasons 1–2)
Arturo Del Puerto as Octavio Rosales (seasons 1, 3), an undocumented Mexican immigrant who settles in Houston with his daughter Aleida.
Ben Begley as Charlie Duke (season 1)
Rebecca Wisocky as Marge Slayton (season 1)
Meghan Leathers as Pam Horton, a barkeeper and later a poet.
Chris Agos as Buzz Aldrin (season 1)
Ryan Kennedy as Michael Collins (season 1)
Noah Harpster as Bill Strausser, a Mission Controller.
Nick Toren as Tim 'Bird Dog' McKiernan (seasons 1–2), a Mission Controller.
Daniel Robbins as Hank Poppen (season 1), a Mission Controller.
Dave Power as astronaut Frank Sedgewick (season 1; guest season 2), the Command Module Pilot of Apollo 15.
Spencer Garrett as Roger Scott (season 1; guest season 2), a news anchor.
Teddy Blum and Tait Blum as Shane Baldwin (season 1), the son of Ed and Karen Baldwin.
William Lee Holler (season 1), Zakary Risinger (guest season 1) and David Chandler (seasons 2–3) as Jimmy Stevens, the younger son of Gordo and Tracy Stevens.
Teya Patt as Emma Jorgens, MSC receptionist in season one and Margo's new assistant in season two.
Krystal Torres as Cata (season 1), one of Aleida's and Octavio's roommates in Houston.
Nate Corddry as Larry Wilson, a NASA engineer and Ellen's eventual husband.
Dan Warner as Air Force General Arthur Weber (season 1), military liaison to NASA.
Lenny Jacobson as Wayne Cobb (seasons 1–2; guest season 3), Molly's pot-smoking artist husband.
Edwin Hodge as Clayton Poole (season 1), Danielle's first husband.
Tracy Mulholland as Gloria Sedgewick (season 1), the wife of Frank Sedgewick.
Wallace Langham as Harold Weisner (season 1), the NASA administrator in the Ted Kennedy administration.
Leonora Pitts as Irene Hendricks (seasons 1–2), the first woman Flight Director.
James Urbaniak as Gavin Donahue (season 1)
Megan Dodds as Andrea Walters (season 1; guest season 2), a news anchor.
John Marshall Jones as Air Force General Nelson Bradford (season 2; guest season 3), military liaison to NASA.
Michael Benz as Gary Piscotty (season 2), the pilot of Pathfinder.
Michaela Conlin as Helena Webster (season 2), a Marine pilot and astronaut.
Tim Jo as Steve Pomeranz (season 2)
Charlie Schlatter as Paul Michaels (season 2), a news anchor.
Linda Park as Amy Chang (season 2), a news anchor.
Scott Michael Campbell as Alex Rossi (season 2; guest season 3), commander of Jamestown Moon Base in 1983.
Kayla Blake as Dr. Kouri (season 2), doctor on Jamestown Moon Base in 1983.
Ellen Wroe as Sally Ride (season 2)
Alex Akpobome as Paul DeWeese (season 2)
Daniel David Stewart as Nick Corrado (seasons 2–3), an astronaut on Jamestown Moon Base in 1983, later an astronaut for Helios.
Connor Tillman as Vance Paulson (season 2), head of the Marine detachment at Jamestown.
Zac Titus as Charles Bernitz (seasons 2–3), a "Moon Marine" and later a conspiracy theorist against NASA.
Andre Boyer as Jason Wilhelm (season 2), a "Moon Marine".
Chris Cortez as Steve Lopez (season 2), a "Moon Marine".
Jeff Hephner as Sam Cleveland (season 2; guest season 3), Tracy's second husband and Karen's business partner
Piotr Adamczyk as Sergei Nikulov (seasons 2–3), initially a Soviet engineer on the Apollo–Soyuz team.
Josh Duvendeck as Nathan Morrison (season 2), an astronaut on the Apollo-Soyuz mission. 
Alexander Sokovikov as Rolan Efimovitch Baranov (seasons 2–3), initially a Soviet cosmonaut and later astronaut.
Sean Patrick Thomas as Corey Johnson (season 3), Danielle's second husband.
Justice as Isaiah Johnson (season 3), Corey's son and Danielle's step-son.
Jorge Diaz as Victor Diaz (season 3), the husband of Aleida Rosales.
Madeline Bertani as Amber Stevens (season 3), the wife of Danny Stevens.
Sahana Srinivasan as Nuri Prabakar (season 3), Margo's new assistant.
Lev Gorn as Grigory Kuznetsov (season 3), a Soviet cosmonaut on the Mars 94 mission.
Vera Cherny as Lenara Catiche (season 3), the new director of the Soviet Space Organisation, Roscosmos.
Patricia Mizen as Janice Haan (season 3), a reporter.
Hailey Winslow as Karla Dunn (season 3), a reporter.
Ken Rudulph as Edward Kline (season 3), a news anchor.
John Hartmann as Richard Truly (season 3)
Tiago Martinez as Javier Diaz (season 3), the son of Aleida Rosales.
Randy Oglesby as Governor Jim Bragg (season 3), Ellen's vice president.
Jessica Tuck as Christine Francis (season 3), a news anchor.
Cheyenne Perez as Heather (season 3), a Helios employee.
Larry Sullivan as Ryan Bauer (season 3), a news anchor.
Allison Dunbar as Jenna Leigh (season 3), a news anchor.
Robert Bailey Jr. as Will Tyler (season 3), an astronaut on Sojourner.
Taylor Dearden as Sunny Hall (season 3), a conspiracy theorist who meets Jimmy Stevens.
Stewart Skelton as Dick Gephardt (season 3)
Pawel Szajda as Alexei Poletov (season 3), a Soviet cosmonaut on the Mars 94 mission.
Larry Clarke as Bill McGann (season 3), a news anchor.
Amol Shah as Adarsh Sethi (season 3), an astronaut for Helios.
Anne Beyer as Louisa Mueller (season 3), an astronaut for Helios.
Nick Boraine as Lars Hagstrom (season 3), an astronaut for Helios.
Mandy Levin as Sandy Bostik (season 3), an astronaut for Helios.
Ayinde Howell as Benjamin Harmon (season 3), an astronaut for Helios.
William Cowart as Hal (season 3), a conspiracy theorist.
Goran Ivanovski as Dr. Dimitri Mayakovsky (season 3; guest season 2), a Soviet cosmonaut on the Moon and Mars 94 mission.
Ilza Ponko as Isabel Castillo (season 3), a Cuban cosmonaut on the Mars 94 mission.
Blair Hickey as Richard "Dicky" Hilliard (season 3), the co-founder of Helios Aerospace.

Guest

Jeff Branson as Neil Armstrong (season 1)
Steven Pritchard as Pete Conrad (season 1)
Saul Rubinek as Charles Sandman (season 1)
Cass Buggé as Patty Doyle (season 1), one of "Nixon's Women".
Brian Stepanek as Shorty Powers (season 1)
Matt Battaglia as John Glenn (season 1)
Stephen Oyoung as Harrison Liu (season 1), an astronaut.
Mark Ivanir as Mikhail Mikhailovich Vasiliev (season 1), a Soviet cosmonaut.
Bjørn Alexander as Wubbo Ockels (season 2)
Garrett Reisman as a fictionalized version of himself (season 2), a shuttle pilot. Reisman also serves as a technical consultant on the show.
Nikola Djuricko as Stepan Petrovich Alexseev (season 2), a cosmonaut on the Apollo–Soyuz mission. 
Alexander Babara as Radislav Semenovich Orlov (season 2), a cosmonaut on the Apollo-Soyuz mission.
Dustin Seavey as Lee Atwater (season 2)
Tony Curran as Clarke Halladay (season 3), a Scottish astronaut.
Heidi Sulzman as Sylvie Kaplan (season 3), an astronaut.
John Forest as Jeremy Zielke (season 3), a White House employee.
C. S. Lee as Lee Jung-Gil (season 3), a North Korean cosmonaut.

Historical and real world figures in archive footage

Tom Brokaw
Frank Borman
Scott Carpenter
Jimmy Carter
Bill Clinton
Kurt Cobain
Gordon Cooper
Mikhail Gorbachev
Gus Grissom
Gary Hart
John F. Kennedy
Ted Kennedy
Jeane Kirkpatrick
Henry Kissinger
Tom Lehrer
John Lennon
Jim Lovell
Richard Nixon
John Paul II
Jonathan Pollard
Ronald Reagan
Wally Schirra
Alan Shepard
George Shultz
Margaret Thatcher
Donald Trump
Alex Trebek

Episodes

Season 1 (2019)

Season 2 (2021)

Season 3 (2022)
{{Episode table|background=#FB654E|overall=|season=|title=|director=|writer=|airdate=|released=y|episodes=

 
{{Episode list
 |EpisodeNumber   = 25
 |EpisodeNumber2  = 5
 |Title           = Seven Minutes of Terror 
 |DirectedBy      = Andrew Stanton
 |WrittenBy       = Sabrina Almeida
 |OriginalAirDate = 
 |ShortSummary    = The Sojourner and Mars-94 crews bury their dead comrades in space. Sergei has been tortured in a KGB prison, but Margo gets him to Houston in return for giving the Russians some of Sojourner'''s mission resources. Phoenix removes Helios's flight control lock, angering Dev. Karen resigns from Helios in disgust at their refusal to aid Mars-94. Aleida discovers the Russian engines are copies of the American engines. Danny learns the password to let him listen to the video messages that Karen and Ed are sending each other. Phoenix arrives at Mars followed by Sojourner. Kelly and cosmonaut Alexei Poletov kiss. Phoenix attempts to land but Ed aborts the landing due to poor visibility. Danielle successfully lands Sojourner on Mars. Danielle and the Soviet commander, Kuznetsov, wrestle each other to be first on Mars and appear to fall on the Mars surface together simultaneously.
 |LineColor       = #FB654E
}}

}}

Production
Development

According to Ronald D. Moore, the idea of the show came about during lunch with former NASA astronaut Garrett Reisman, when they discussed the possibility of an alternate history in which the Soviets reached the Moon before the Americans. On December 15, 2017, it was announced that Apple had given the production a one-season series order. The series was created by Ronald D. Moore, Matt Wolpert, and Ben Nedivi. Maril Davis serves as executive producer alongside Moore, Wolpert, and Nedivi. Production companies involved with the series include Sony Pictures Television and Tall Ship Productions. On October 5, 2018, it was announced that the series had been officially titled For All Mankind. The series was renewed for a second season in October 2019. On November 19, 2020, it was announced that the second season would premiere on February 19, 2021. On December 8, 2020, ahead of the second-season premiere, Apple TV+ renewed the series for a third season. On July 22, 2022, Apple TV+ renewed the series for a fourth season.

Casting
In August 2018, it was announced that Joel Kinnaman, Michael Dorman, Sarah Jones, Shantel VanSanten, and Wrenn Schmidt had been cast in main roles and that Eric Ladin, Arturo Del Puerto, and Rebecca Wisocky would appear in a recurring capacity. On October 5, 2018, it was reported that Jodi Balfour had been cast in a series regular role. 

On November 19, 2020, Cynthy Wu, Coral Peña and Casey W. Johnson had been cast in main roles for the second season. Also, Krys Marshall and Sonya Walger were promoted to the main cast for the second season. On December 16, 2020, Michaela Conlin joined the cast in a supporting role for the second season.

In June 2021, it was reported that Edi Gathegi joined the season three cast as a series regular.

In August 2022, it was reported that Daniel Stern joined the cast as a series regular for the fourth season. In September 2022, Toby Kebbell and Tyner Rushing joined the cast as series regulars for the fourth season. In November 2022, Svetlana Efremova joined the cast as a series regular for the fourth season.

Filming
Principal photography for the series commenced in August 2018 in Los Angeles, California. In March 2019, The New York Times reported that filming had concluded. The filming for the second season began on December 24, 2019. On August 17, 2020, production on second season resumed after the COVID-19 halt, and the final two episodes were filmed. Filming for the third season began on February 25, 2021 and concluded in mid-September 2021. Filming for the fourth season began in August 2022.

Release
The first season of For All Mankind premiered on Apple TV+ on November 1, 2019, and consisted of 10 episodes, releasing weekly until December 20, 2019. The second season premiered on February 19, 2021, and consisted of 10 episodes, releasing weekly until April 23, 2021. The third season premiered on June 10, 2022, and consisted of 10 episodes, releasing weekly until August 12, 2022.

Marketing
On February 11, 2021, ahead of the season two premiere, Apple released an augmented reality iOS application on the App Store called For All Mankind: Time Capsule. The application walks users through the decade-long gap between seasons one and two, showing the relationship between astronauts Gordo and Tracy Stevens, and their son Danny Stevens. At the 73rd Primetime Creative Arts Emmy Awards, For All Mankind: Time Capsule won an award for Outstanding Innovation in Interactive Programming.

For season two, Apple released a podcast titled For All Mankind: The Official Podcast, produced in partnership with At Will Media, releasing every two weeks starting February 19, 2021. It is hosted by Krys Marshall, who plays Danielle Poole, and features behind-the-scenes looks and interviews with scientists, former astronauts, and the cast and crew of For All Mankind.

For season three, Apple released a companion video series titled The Science behind For All Mankind for corresponding episodes from season 3. It is hosted by Wrenn Schmidt, who plays Margo Madison, and has her explain and breakdown the scientific topics shown on the series.

Reception

Season 1
The first season of For All Mankind received generally positive reviews. The review aggregator website Rotten Tomatoes reported a 74% approval rating with an average rating of 7/10, based on 54 reviews. The website's critical consensus reads, "Though it shoots for the Moon and falls somewhere in orbit, For All Mankinds impressive vision of history has the potential for real liftoff if it leans into the things that set it apart instead of settling for more of the same." Metacritic, which uses a weighted average, assigned a score of 65 out of 100 based on 22 critics, indicating "generally favorable reviews".

Season 2
On Rotten Tomatoes, the second season has a 100% approval rating with an average rating of 7.5/10, based on 22 reviews. The website's critical consensus reads, "For All Mankinds sophomore flight isn't without its hiccups, but compelling character work and a renewed sense of wonder make for thrilling viewing." On Metacritic, it has a weighted score of 75 out of 100 based on 7 reviews, indicating "generally favorable reviews".

Season 3
On Rotten Tomatoes, the third season has a 97% approval rating with an average rating of 8.2/10, based on 32 reviews. The website's critical consensus reads, "For All Mankind''s third season goes as far as Mars while maintaining a homey focus on its original ensemble, delivering another epic adventure with an intimate focus." On Metacritic, it has a weighted score of 84 out of 100 based on 15 reviews, indicating "universal acclaim".

Accolades

Music

Season 1 Original Soundtrack

Season 2 Original Soundtrack

Season 3 Original Soundtrack

References

External links
  – official site
 

2019 American television series debuts
2010s American drama television series
2010s American LGBT-related drama television series
2010s American science fiction television series
2020s American drama television series
2020s American LGBT-related drama television series
2020s American science fiction television series
Alternate history television series
Apple TV+ original programming
Cultural depictions of American men
Cultural depictions of Buzz Aldrin
Cultural depictions of Michael Collins (astronaut)
Cultural depictions of Neil Armstrong
Cultural depictions of Wernher von Braun
Cultural depictions of Richard Nixon
English-language television shows
Lesbian-related television shows
LGBT speculative fiction television series
Mars in television
Television series about NASA
Television series about space programs
Television series about the Apollo program
Television series about the Cold War
Television series about the Moon
Television series by Sony Pictures Television
Television series set in 1969
Television series set in 1970
Television series set in 1971
Television series set in 1972
Television series set in 1973
Television series set in 1974
Television series set in 1983
Television series set in 1992
Television series set in 1995